Jim Cummins (March 11, 1945 – October 26, 2007) was an American television reporter for the NBC News network. He became a somewhat recognizable member of the network, having worked there for nearly thirty years.

Education
Cummins was born in Cedar Rapids, Iowa. He was a basketball player and member of the Regis Catholic High School 1962 state champion squad. From 1963 to 1967, Cummins attended Northwestern University's Medill School of Journalism and earned both his bachelor's and master's degrees. He was also a forward at for the Wildcats basketball team at NU.

Career
Cummins began his professional career at KGLO-TV in Mason City, Iowa, in 1969. From there, his career took him to WOTV (Grand Rapids, Michigan), WTMJ-TV (Milwaukee), and WMAQ (Chicago).

He joined NBC News in 1978 working out of their Chicago bureau. In 1989, Cummins reopened NBC's Southwest bureau in Dallas, becoming its correspondent. Over the years, he reported on various stories including U.S. political coverage, plane crashes, the Iran hostage crisis, the Salvadoran Civil War, the Oklahoma City bombing, many hurricanes, floods, and tornadoes, and live coverage of the Waco Siege. Cummins' work manifested itself when he won an Award for his coverage of the Midwest floods in 1993. He also earned two National Emmy nominations for his coverage of Hurricane Hugo and the Salvadoran Civil War.

Cummins retired from his NBC position in 2007, but shortly after was diagnosed with cancer. He died at the Presbyterian Hospital of Plano on October 26 at age 62, and was buried at Sparkman-Hillcrest Memorial Park Cemetery in Dallas. Cummins was survived by his widow and six children.

Personal life
Jim Cummins had an extensive family consisting of his wife, Connie of Dallas; three daughters, Chrissy Cummins and Molly Cummins, both of Dallas, and Kim of Lafayette; three sons, John Cummins of Dallas, Billy Cummins, a student of University of Oklahoma, and Doug Cummins of Waco; two brothers, Richard Cummins of New York City and Bob Cummins of Sarasota; and two grandchildren. He also coached youth baseball and basketball teams for his six children.

Molestation lawsuits

In 1962, Cummins, then a 17-year-old altar boy, alleged that he was sexually molested by his parish priest, Reverend William Roach. In 2002, his repressed history was reflected through Cummins's interview with a family dealing with a similar, situation. Cummins filed the first of fifteen lawsuits against the Archdiocese of Dubuque and priests accused of child molestation.

References

External links

1945 births
2007 deaths
NBC News people
American war correspondents
American male journalists
Medill School of Journalism alumni
People from Cedar Rapids, Iowa
Deaths from cancer in Texas
Burials at Sparkman-Hillcrest Memorial Park Cemetery